Painful is the sixth studio album by American indie rock band Yo La Tengo, released in 1993 by record label Matador, their first for the label.

Content 

The album marked a creative shift from Yo La Tengo's previous work, blending atmospheric and ambient sounds with their famous noise jams. Painful features a much more melody-driven Yo La Tengo in its hazy, dream-like songwriting.

Two versions of the track "Big Day Coming" are present on the album and display the range of musical stylings Yo La Tengo works with; the first version features a simple organ melody accompanied by a soft bass counterpoint and Kaplan's guitar feedback echoing in the background, while the second version is a much more straightforward, shoegaze style with an accompanying organ solo towards the latter part of the song.

Release 

On 2 December 2014, the album was reissued with bonus material as Extra Painful, available on double CD, double vinyl and as a digital download.

Track listing

 Notes
 An exact reproduction of the original single Shaker 7" came with the vinyl edition.
 15 additional bonus tracks were available for download

Personnel
 Georgia Hubley – drums, percussion, vocals, guitar, organ
 Ira Kaplan – vocals, guitar, organ, percussion
 James McNew – bass, vocals, guitar, percussion

References

External links 

 

1993 albums
Yo La Tengo albums
Matador Records albums